Koppang Church is a chapel of the Church of Norway in Stor-Elvdal Municipality in Innlandet county, Norway. It is located in the town of Koppang. It is an annex chapel for the Stor-Elvdal parish which is part of the Sør-Østerdal prosti (deanery) in the Diocese of Hamar. The white, wooden church was built in 1952 using plans drawn up by the architect Ivar Ulvmoen. The church seats about 120 people.

History
The chapel was approved for construction in 1945, but the implementation took time. The chapel was designed by Ivar Ulvmoen and built in 1952. The chapel also houses the parish offices. The new building was consecrated on 6 September 1953 by the Bishop Kristian Schjelderup.

See also
List of churches in Hamar

References

Stor-Elvdal
Churches in Innlandet
Long churches in Norway
Wooden churches in Norway
20th-century Church of Norway church buildings
Churches completed in 1952
1952 establishments in Norway